Rob Roy: The Highland Rogue is a 1953 adventure film produced by RKO-Walt Disney British Productions which is about Rob Roy MacGregor. It was the last Disney film released through RKO Radio Pictures.

Plot
The film begins in the early 18th century with Rob Roy leading his McGregor clansmen against King George I's forces commanded by the Scottish Duke of Argyll.

While determined to establish order in the Highlands, Argyll is sympathetic to "the bonny blue bonnets" whom he is fighting, even refusing to unleash German mercenaries against them. A final charge by royal dragoons scatters the clansmen but honour appears satisfied and Rob Roy returns to his village to wed his beloved Helen.

The wedding celebrations are interrupted by fencibles – the private army of the Duke of Montrose who has been appointed as the King's Secretary of State for Scotland and who lacks Argyll's regard for the highlanders. All clans involved in the Jacobite rising of 1715 are pardoned except for the McGregors.

Rob Roy is arrested and the Clan McGregor is deprived of the right to use its name. Rob Roy escapes, leaping a waterfall and subsequently leads McGregor opposition to the increasingly repressive regime imposed by Montrose through his agent Killearn. During a skirmish with the fencibles McGregor's mother is killed. A fort is stormed by the clan and its garrison of royal soldiers taken prisoner.

The Duke of Argyll goes to King George to plead the case for leniency for the Clan McGregor, who have been forced into rebellion. Montrose urges repression.

At this crucial point Rob Roy appears at the royal court, heralded by a piper. Rob Roy's self-evident qualities quickly convince the king to pardon him and his clan. After an exchange of compliments: "Rob Roy – you are a great rogue"; "and you sire are a great king", the McGregor returns to his people and his wife.

Cast

Production

Proposed Gainsborough Versions
In 1938, Gainsborough Pictures announced plans to make a Rob Roy film starring Will Fyffe, Margaret Lockwood and Michael Redgrave directed by Carol Reed. Leslie Arliss and Curt Siodmak wrote a script. The film was postponed due to World War II. In 1945, J. Arthur Rank, who by then owned Gainsborough, announced that he would make a film of the story, and that Stewart Granger would star in it. However the film was not made.

Walt Disney
Disney had enjoyed success with its first live-action film, Treasure Island (1950), shot in England. He followed it up with two more costume adventure tales,  The Story of Robin Hood and His Merrie Men and The Sword and the Rose both directed by Ken Annakin and starring Richard Todd.

In September 1952, Disney announced that Todd would star in a film about Rob Roy immediately after Sword and the Rose, and that the film would have a budget of approximately $1.8 million. The story would be based on "history and legend" rather than the novel by Sir Walter Scott. (He was considering making a film about King Arthur afterwards. ) (Another report said the script would be based on a book by Daniel Dafoe.)

Todd's fee was £15,000. He said that Roy "instituted the first protection racket."

"I like history," said Disney. "It's universal. Subjects like Robin Hood and the Tudors appeal to everyone. And costumes don't date, you know. I can release these films over and over again and they won't get the kind of laugh you get from modern subjects made ten years back."

When the Rank Organisation refused to loan Annakin out to Disney again, Disney chose Harold French (who had worked with Annakin on some Somerset Maugham portmanteau films) to direct the film. Rob Roy was filmed just as Sword and the Rose was released.

The casting of Glynis Johns was announced in March 1953. The other lead was James Robertson Justice, who had just made The Sword and the Rose with Johns and Todd.

Shooting
Rob Roy was shot on location in Scotland, including at Corriegrennan. Richard Todd related in his autobiography that the extras were soldiers of the Argyll and Sutherland Highlanders who had just returned from the Korean War.

Todd said that as well as providing thrilling battle scenes for the viewers, the soldiers used the opportunity to enthusiastically get back at their non-commissioned officers.

Todd also sheepishly admitted that his first scene leading a charge, led to an injury when he stepped in a rabbit hole.

The soldiers only received their normal pay of seven shillings a day. The War Office received 25 shillings a day. Questions about these payments were raised in the Parliament of the United Kingdom. Filming took place near Aberfoyle.

Studio scenes were shot at Elstree Studios.

Release
The film premiere was the Royal Command Performance Film Gala on 26 October 1953 at the Odeon Leicester Square in London.

Reception

Critical
The New York Times critic Bosley Crowther described it as "a fine lot of fighting among the hills, shooting of rifles, banging of claymores, skirling of pipes and buzzing of burrs, filmed and recorded in color on the actual Scottish countryside. And while Mr. Todd is not precisely the Rob Roy that history records, he is indeed a satisfactory fabrication until a better Rob Roy comes along."

Box Office
In June 1954 Walt Disney admitted that the box office returns of this and The Sword in the Rose were "not up to expectations" in the US but they performed better in other countries and were expected to return their costs. However he pulled back on making costume pictures as a result.

According to Kinematograph Weekly the film was a "money maker" at the British box office in 1954.

References

External links
 
 
 
 

1953 films
1950s historical adventure films
American biographical films
American historical adventure films
British historical adventure films
Walt Disney Pictures films
Films shot at Associated British Studios
Films set in Scotland
Films shot in Scotland
Films set in the 18th century
Films set in the 1720s
British biographical films
Cultural depictions of Rob Roy MacGregor
Films directed by Harold French
Films produced by Perce Pearce
Films produced by Walt Disney
1950s biographical films
1950s English-language films
1950s American films
1950s British films